The Cantemir Vodă National College is a high school in Bucharest, Romania.  It was founded on  October 27, 1868.

The school building is listed as a historic monument by Romania's Ministry of Culture and Religious Affairs.

Notable alumni
George Călinescu
Mircea Cărtărescu 
Ion G. Duca
Alexandru Mironescu
Lucian Pintilie
George Mihail Zamfirescu

Notable teachers
Ion Barbu
Charles Drouhet
Constantin Giurescu
Traian Lalescu
Vasile Păun
Horia Stamatu
I. E. Torouțiu

External links 
 Official site
 LinkedIn

Notes

High schools in Bucharest
Educational institutions established in 1868
National Colleges in Romania
1868 establishments in Romania
Historic monuments in Bucharest